Mesabolivar is a genus of cellar spiders that was first described by M. A. González-Sponga in 1998.

Species
 it contains ninety-four species, found only in South America and on Trinidad:
M. acrensis Huber, 2018 – Brazil
M. amadoi Huber, 2018 – Brazil
M. amanaye Huber, 2018 – Brazil
M. amazonicus Huber, 2018 – Brazil
M. anseriformis (González-Sponga, 2011) – Venezuela
M. argentinensis (Mello-Leitão, 1938) – Argentina
M. aurantiacus (Mello-Leitão, 1930) – Northern South America
M. azureus (Badcock, 1932) – Brazil
M. baianus Huber, 2018 – Brazil
M. banksi (Moenkhaus, 1898) – Brazil
M. beckeri (Huber, 2000) – Brazil
M. bico Huber, 2018 – Brazil
M. bicuspis Huber, 2018 – Brazil
M. bonita Huber, 2015 – Brazil
M. borgesi Huber, 2018 – Argentina
M. botocudo Huber, 2000 – Brazil
M. brasiliensis (Moenkhaus, 1898) – Brazil
M. buraquinho Huber, 2018 – Brazil
M. caipora Huber, 2015 – Brazil
M. camacan Huber, 2018 – Brazil
M. camussi Machado, Yamamoto, Brescovit & Huber, 2007 – Brazil
M. cantharus Machado, Yamamoto, Brescovit & Huber, 2007 – Brazil
M. catarinensis Huber, 2018 – Brazil
M. cavicelatus Machado, Brescovit, Candiani & Huber, 2007 – Brazil
M. ceruleiventris (Mello-Leitão, 1916) – Brazil
M. chapeco Huber, 2018 – Brazil, Argentina
M. charrua Machado, Laborda, Simó & Brescovit, 2013 – Brazil, Uruguay
M. claricae Huber, 2018 – Brazil
M. constrictus Huber, 2018 – Brazil
M. cuarassu Huber, Brescovit & Rheims, 2005 – Brazil
M. cyaneomaculatus (Keyserling, 1891) – Brazil
M. cyaneotaeniatus (Keyserling, 1891) – Brazil
M. cyaneus (Taczanowski, 1874) – Venezuela, French Guiana, Guyana, Brazil
M. delclaroi Machado & Brescovit, 2012 – Brazil
M. difficilis (Mello-Leitão, 1918) – Brazil
M. eberhardi Huber, 2000 – Trinidad, Colombia, Venezuela, Peru, Brazil
M. embapua Machado, Brescovit & Francisco, 2007 – Brazil
M. exlineae (Mello-Leitão, 1947) – Peru
M. forceps Machado, Brescovit, Candiani & Huber, 2007 – Brazil
M. gabettae Huber, 2015 – Brazil
M. giupponii Huber, 2015 – Brazil
M. globulosus (Nicolet, 1849) – Chile, Argentina
M. goitaca Huber, 2015 – Brazil
M. guapiara Huber, 2000 – Brazil
M. guaycolec Huber, 2018 – Argentina
M. huambisa Huber, 2000 – Peru, Ecuador
M. huanuco Huber, 2000 – Peru
M. huberi Machado, Brescovit & Francisco, 2007 – Brazil
M. iguazu Huber, 2000 – Brazil, Argentina
M. inmanis Huber, 2018 – Brazil
M. inornatus Huber, 2015 – Brazil
M. itajai Huber, 2018 – Brazil
M. itapoa Huber, 2015 – Brazil
M. jamari Huber, 2018 – Brazil
M. junin Huber, 2000 – Peru
M. kaingang Huber, 2018 – Brazil
M. kathrinae Huber, 2015 – Brazil
M. locono Huber, 2000 – Suriname, Guyana
M. macushi Huber, 2018 – Venezuela
M. madalena Huber, 2018 – Brazil
M. mairyara Machado, Brescovit, Candiani & Huber, 2007 – Brazil
M. maraba Huber, 2018 – Brazil
M. maxacali Huber, 2000 – Brazil
M. mimoso Huber, 2018 – Brazil
M. monteverde Huber, 2015 – Brazil
M. murici Huber, 2018 – Brazil
M. nigridentis (Mello-Leitão, 1922) – Brazil
M. niteroi Huber, 2018 – Brazil
M. pallens Huber, 2018 – Brazil
M. paraensis (Mello-Leitão, 1947) – Brazil
M. pau Huber, 2015 – Brazil
M. perezi Huber, 2015 – Brazil
M. pseudoblechroscelis González-Sponga, 1998 (type) – Venezuela
M. rudilapsi Machado, Brescovit & Francisco, 2007 – Brazil
M. saci Huber, 2018 – Brazil
M. sai Huber, 2015 – Brazil
M. samatiaguassu Huber, Brescovit & Rheims, 2005 – Brazil
M. sepitus Huber, 2018 – Brazil
M. serrapelada Huber, 2018 – Brazil
M. similis Huber, 2018 – Brazil
M. simoni (Moenkhaus, 1898) – Brazil
M. spinosus (González-Sponga, 2005) – Venezuela
M. spinulosus (Mello-Leitão, 1939) – Brazil
M. tabatinga Huber, 2018 – Peru, Brazil
M. tamoio Huber, 2015 – Brazil
M. tandilicus (Mello-Leitão, 1940) – Uruguay, Argentina
M. tapajos Huber, 2018 – Brazil
M. togatus (Keyserling, 1891) – Brazil
M. turvo Huber, 2018 – Brazil
M. unicornis Huber, 2015 – Brazil
M. uruguayensis Machado, Laborda, Simó & Brescovit, 2013 – Brazil, Uruguay, Argentina
M. xingu Huber, 2000 – Brazil
M. yucuma Huber, 2018 – Brazil
M. yuruani (Huber, 2000) – Venezuela

See also
 List of Pholcidae species

References

Araneomorphae genera
Pholcidae
Spiders of South America